The AB toxins are two-component protein complexes secreted by a number of pathogenic bacteria, though there is a pore-forming AB toxin found the eggs of a snail. They can be classified as Type III toxins because they interfere with internal cell function. They are named AB toxins due to their components: the "A" component is usually the "active" portion, and the "B" component is usually the "binding" portion. The "A" subunit possesses enzyme activity, and is transferred to the host cell following a conformational change in the membrane-bound transport "B" subunit. These proteins consist of two independent polypeptides, which correspond to the A/B subunit moieties. The enzyme component (A) enters the cell through endosomes produced by the oligomeric binding/translocation protein (B), and prevents actin polymerisation through ADP-ribosylation of monomeric G-actin.

Examples of the "A" component of an AB toxin include C. perfringens iota toxin Ia, C. botulinum C2 toxin CI, and Clostridium difficile ADP-ribosyltransferase. Other homologous proteins have been found in Clostridium spiroforme.

An example of the B component of an AB toxin is Bacillus anthracis protective antigen (PA) protein, B. anthracis secretes three toxin factors: the protective antigen (PA); the oedema factor (EF); and the lethal factor (LF). Each is a thermolabile protein of ~80kDa. PA forms the "B" part of the exotoxin and allows passage of the "A" moiety (consisting of EF or LF) into target cells. PA protein forms the central part of the complete anthrax toxin, and translocates the A moiety into host cells after assembling as a heptamer in the membrane.

The Diphtheria toxin also is an AB toxin. It inhibits protein synthesis in the host cell through phosphorylation of the eukaryotic elongation factor 2, which is an essential component for protein synthesis. The exotoxin A of Pseudomonas aeruginosa is another example of an AB toxin that targets the eukaryotic elongation factor 2.

The AB5 toxins are usually considered a type of AB toxin, characterized by B pentamers. Less commonly, the term "AB toxin" is used to emphasize the monomeric character of the B component.

The two-phase mechanism of action of AB toxins is of particular interest in cancer therapy research. The general idea is to modify the B component of existing toxins to selectively bind to malignant cells. This approach combines results from cancer immunotherapy with the high toxicity of AB toxins, giving raise to a new class of chimeric protein drugs, called immunotoxins.

See also
Toxalbumin
Perivitellin-2

References

Bacterial toxins
Protein families